T. Anderson may refer to:

Terry Anderson (disambiguation)
Theodore Wilbur Anderson (1918–2016), American mathematician
Thomas Anderson (disambiguation)
Tim Anderson (disambiguation)
Tina Anderson, American comic writer
Todd Anderson, rugby league footballer

See also
Theresa Andersson (born 1972), singer-songwriter